Crash Craddock Live! is a live album released by Billy "Crash" Craddock. It was released on the Cee Cee label in 1985. The album was recorded at the Little Nashville Opry in Nashville, Indiana.

Track listing
Introduction
It'll Be Me
Ruby Baby
Easy As Pie
Knock Three Times
Rock & Roll Medley
Why Me Lord
Darlin
There Goes My Everything
This Time
Rub It In
Old Time Rock & Roll

1985 live albums
Billy "Crash" Craddock live albums